Motbeg-e Vosta (also Romanized as Moţbeg-e Vosţá; also known as Modbag-e Vosţá, Modbeg-e Vosţá, Modīg-e Vasaţ, Motbak, Motbak-e Vosţá, Moţbek-e ‘Abd ol ‘Alī, Moţbek-e ‘Akāshī, and Moţlebek-e Vasaţ) is a village in Abdoliyeh-ye Gharbi Rural District, in the Central District of Ramshir County, Khuzestan Province, Iran. At the 2006 census, its population was 65, in 11 families.

References 

Populated places in Ramshir County